Árni Frederiksberg (born 13 June 1992) is a Faroese professional footballer who plays as an attacking midfielder or a winger for KÍ Klaksvík.

Career
Árni Frederiksberg has spent most of his career with his childhood club NSÍ Runavík. But on 1 November 2018, Frederiksberg signed a pre-contract with B36 Tórshavn, were he immediately became one of the leading players.

Honours
NSÍ
 Faroe Islands Cup: 2017

KÍ
 Faroe Islands Premier League: 2021

References

External links
 
 

1992 births
Living people
Association football midfielders
Faroese footballers
Faroe Islands international footballers
Faroe Islands Premier League players
NSÍ Runavík players
B36 Tórshavn players